James Bettner Brooke (born February 21, 1955, in New York City) is an American journalist who currently serves as editor in chief of the Ukraine Business News, an English-language subscription news site based in Kyiv, Ukraine. Previously, he was editor in chief of the English-language Khmer Times newspaper, in Cambodia. From 2010 to 2014, he was the Russia/former Soviet Union Bureau Chief for Voice of America, based in Moscow. For VOA, he wrote Russia Watch, a weekly blog. Previously, he worked as Moscow Bureau Chief for Bloomberg. Before Bloomberg, he reported for 24 years for The New York Times, largely overseas in countries such as Japan, South Korea, Ivory Coast and Brazil.

Posts held by Brooke at The New York Times have included:
 assistant to James Reston, Washington columnist, 1978–80
 metropolitan reporter, 1984–86
 bureau chief, Abidjan, Ivory Coast, December 1986-January 1989
 bureau chief, Rio de Janeiro, Brazil, February 1989-July 1995
 Rocky Mountain bureau chief, Denver, Colorado, August 1995 – 1999
 bureau chief, Canada, August 1999- 2001
 East Asia correspondent (Japan, South Korea, North Korea) based in Tokyo, August 2001-June 2006

Brooke graduated from Yale University with a BA in Latin American studies and was a stringer for United Press International as a student. In 1976, he spent a semester at Pontificia Universidade Catolica in Rio de Janeiro.

After graduation, Brooke was a freelance reporter and part-time staffer at The Berkshire Eagle in Massachusetts from June 1977 to April 1978. Prior to joining the Times as a reporter in 1984, he was the South American correspondent for the Miami Herald.

References

1955 births
Living people
Maria Moors Cabot Prize winners
Yale College alumni
Journalists from New York City
20th-century American journalists
American male journalists
Voice of America people
Bloomberg L.P. people
Miami Herald people
The New York Times writers